Happy Baral is a Bangladesh Awami League politician and the former Member of Parliament from reserved seat-11.

Early life
Baral was born on 1 January 1968.

Career
Baral was elected to Parliament on 5 January 2014 from women reserved seat-11 as a Bangladesh Awami League candidate.

Personal life
Baral was married to Kalidas Baral. He was a lawyer, Bangladesh Awami League politician, and member of the Bangladesh Hindu Buddhist Christian Unity Council. He was shot and killed on 20 August 2000. A court in Bagerhat District sentenced five convicts to death on 6 June 2013.

References

Awami League politicians
Living people
1968 births
Bangladeshi Hindus
10th Jatiya Sangsad members
21st-century Bangladeshi women politicians
Women members of the Jatiya Sangsad